Victoria Sanchez may refer to:

 Victoria Sanchez (actress) (born 1976), Canadian film actress
 Victoria Sánchez (musician) (born 1986), Venezuelan conductor and pianist from El Sistema
 Victoria Sánchez (footballer) (born 2005), Salvadoran footballer